The Mercedes D.I (also known as the Type E6F) was a six-cylinder, water-cooled, SOHC valvetrain inline engine developed in Germany for use in aircraft in 1913. Developing 75 kW (100 hp), it powered many German military aircraft during the very early part of World War I.

Applications
 AEG B.I
 AEG G.I
 Albatros B.I
 Albatros G.I
 Aviatik B.I
 DFW B.I
 DFW Floh
 Fokker D.I
 Friedrichshafen FF.19
 Gotha G.I
 LFG V 39
 LFG Roland Arrow
 Stahlwerk-Mark R.V
 Pfalz E.V

Specifications (D.I)

See also

References

Further reading

Mercedes aircraft engines
1910s aircraft piston engines